The Deputy Speaker of the National Assembly of Pakistan presides over the assembly whenever the speaker is absent or unable to perform his or her duties. The office has its roots in 1947 when the Deputy Speaker was addressed as the Deputy President of the legislative assembly. After the ratification of the 1973 Constitution of Pakistan, the office was reestablished. Previously  Deputy Speaker was Qasim Suri who was elected by the National Assembly of Pakistan on 15 August 2018 along with the Speaker who is Asad Qaiser.

Role and Responsibilities 
The office of the Deputy Speaker of the National Assembly is created by Article 53 of the Chapter 2 in Part III of the Constitution of Pakistan. The Deputy Speaker acts as Speaker on occasions when the Speaker is unable to do so. If both the Speaker and Deputy Speaker are unable to fulfil the role, another person is appointed to temporarily act as Speaker.

List

See also
 Speaker of National Assembly
 Senate of Pakistan 
 Politics of Pakistan 
 Prime Minister of Pakistan 
 Constitution of Pakistan

References

External links
 Deputy speakers of the National Assembly

National Assembly of Pakistan